Ferdinand Poni was the deputy Minister of Interior Affairs during 2005-2007.

References

Living people
Democratic Party of Albania politicians
Politicians from Tirana
Year of birth missing (living people)